Phillip Ernest Emmanuel  (6 July 1952 – 24 May 2018) was an Australian guitar player who found fame with The Trailblazers, and as the older brother of musician Tommy Emmanuel.

He played with many other Australian artists including INXS, Jimmy Barnes, John Farnham, Ian Moss, composer Pete Hawkes and Slim Dusty, as well as playing with many international artists such as British guitarist Hank B. Marvin and American performers Chet Atkins, Willie Nelson, Duane Eddy and Dolly Parton. His debut album, Kakadu Sunrise, reached No. 33 on the New Zealand album charts.

In 1994 Phil and Tommy Emmanuel released the album Terra Firma and it was nominated for the 1995 ARIA Award for Best Adult Contemporary Album. In 2011, Emmanuel was inducted into the Australian Roll of Renown.

Death and posthumous Order of Australia recognition
Emmanuel died suddenly of an asthma attack in Parkes, New South Wales, on 24 May 2018, aged 65. He was honoured with a posthumous induction into the Order of Australia in 2018 with an OAM, one of several Australian musicians to receive honours including veteran singer-songwriter Brian Cadd.

Discography

Albums

Compilation albums

Extended plays

Singles

Charted singles

Other singles

Awards and honours

ARIA Awards
The Australian Recording Industry Association Music Awards, commonly known as ARIA Music Awards, are held to recognise excellence and innovation and achievement across all genres of Australian music. Award nominees and winners, excluding for sales and public voted categories, are selected by the ARIA Academy comprising "judges from all sectors of the music industry - retail, radio and tv, journalists and critics, television presenters, concert promoters, agents, ARIA member record companies and past ARIA winners". The inaugural ARIA Awards took place in 1987.

Australian Roll of Renown
The Australian Roll of Renown honours Australian and New Zealander musicians who have shaped the music industry by making a significant and lasting contribution to country music. It was inaugurated in 1976 and the inductee is announced at the Country Music Awards of Australia in Tamworth in January. 

|-
| 2011
| Phil Emmanuel
| Australian Roll of Renown
|

Order of Australia

|-
| 2018
| Phil Emmanuel
| Order of Australia
|

References

External links

1952 births
2018 deaths
Australian guitarists
Respiratory disease deaths in New South Wales
Deaths from asthma
Recipients of the Medal of the Order of Australia